Ellenborough Park is a park situated in the centre of Weston-super-Mare, North Somerset, England.

The eastern half of the park contains a play area for local children, which was opened in 2005.

Ellenborough Park was also the subject of a significant legal case Re Ellenborough Park in 1955 which determined criteria for easements in English property law.

Site description

The soil here is calcareous and sandy, and the short-turf grassland which is supports is believed to be remnant dune grassland from this dune system, which was enclosed in the 19th century.

Vegetation

The species composition of this grassland includes the following grasses:
Sand Cat's-tail (Phleum arenarium), Red Fescue (Festuca rubra), Sea Fern-grass (Desmazeria marina) and Cock's-foot (Dactylis glomerata). Herb species present include Sea Stork's-bill (Erodium maritimum), Buck's-horn Plantain (Plantago coronopus), Rough Clover (Trifolium scabrum), all of which are indicative of a maritime influence, plus Wild Clary (Salvia verbenaca), Smooth Hawk's-beard (Crepis capillaris) and Pink-sorrel (Oxalis articulata).

Ellenborough Park supports two Red Data Book plants, Branched Horsetail (Equisetum ramosissimum) and Smooth Rupturewort (Herniaria glabra). Branched Horsetail is only found in one other locality in Great Britain, in Lincolnshire. Smooth Rupturewort is found in eight other localities in Britain, all in East Anglia.

References

See also
 Re Ellenborough Park for summary of English Property Law case.

Sites of Special Scientific Interest in Avon
Weston-super-Mare
Sites of Special Scientific Interest notified in 1989
Parks and open spaces in Somerset